Jean-Pierre Henri "Johnny" Carrère (January 25, 1911 - October 6, 1948)  was a Canadian politician, who represented the electoral district of Cochrane North in the Legislative Assembly of Ontario in 1948. A member of the Ontario Progressive Conservative Party, he was elected in the 1948 election, but died in a car accident after just a few months in office.

He died October 5, 1948 after sustaining injuries in a collision with his vehicle and a train.

References

External links

1911 births
1948 deaths
Accidental deaths in Ontario
Franco-Ontarian people
People from Cochrane District
Progressive Conservative Party of Ontario MPPs
Road incident deaths in Canada